55 Stories is the first solo studio album by American hip hop producer DJ Mayonnaise. It was released on Anticon in 1999.

Production
All of the records used on the album are rock music or jazz, mostly from the late 1960s to mid 1970s. In a 2008 interview, DJ Mayonnaise said: "I made 55 Stories in one shot from start to finish. I had no blueprint or pre-conceived idea. All I did was made a mixtape album on a borrowed Tascam 4-track recorder. I went back and did some small edits after I was done, but the structure and song order was a straight shot. I just made an intro and recorded it. After that I made a beat and recorded that and scratched over it. I just repeated that process until I hit somewhere around 55 minutes (hence the title)."

Critical reception

Tadah of Urban Smarts gave the album a favorable review, writing, "Maybe we just were stuck within the hoopla that's surrounding the Anticon emcees, that we totally forgot that this gathering also has some of the illest beatsmiths amongst them."

Track listing

Personnel
Credits adapted from liner notes.

 DJ Mayonnaise – production
 John Wyman – mastering
 Shalem Bencivenga – cover art
 Rev. Destructo – layout, design

References

External links
 

1999 debut albums
Anticon albums
Hip hop albums by American artists
Instrumental hip hop albums